Stojan Malbašić (born 15 September 1959) is a Bosnian retired professional footballer and football executive who is the current president of Bosnian Premier League club Borac Banja Luka.

Career
Malbašić played for hometown club Borac Banja Luka in the Yugoslav First League, helping the side win the 1987–88 Yugoslav Cup. In 1992, he was part of the Republika Srpska official football team. He later managed Borac in the Bosnian Premier League from 2002 to 2003.

On 23 May 2016, Malbašić was appointed as the secretary of the coaching staff of Borac Banja Luka. He was secretary until 6 August 2020, after which he became the new president of Borac, succeeding Vico Zeljković.

Honours

Player
Borac Banja Luka
Yugoslav Cup: 1987–88
Mitropa Cup: 1992

References

External links
Interview at FK Borac Banja Luka official website

1959 births
Living people
Sportspeople from Banja Luka
Serbs of Bosnia and Herzegovina
Yugoslav footballers
Bosnia and Herzegovina footballers
Yugoslav First League players
Yugoslav Second League players
FK BSK Banja Luka players
FK Borac Banja Luka players
Association football defenders
Bosnia and Herzegovina football managers
FK Borac Banja Luka managers
Premier League of Bosnia and Herzegovina managers
Bosnia and Herzegovina chairpersons of corporations
FK Borac Banja Luka presidents